M104 or M-104 may refer to:

 Sombrero Galaxy, called M104 by Messier number
 M104 group of galaxies
 HMS Walney (M104), a British warship
 M104 Wolverine, a military armored bridge
 M104 155mm Cartridge, a U.S. Army chemical artillery shell
 M104 (New York City bus), a New York City Bus route in Manhattan
 Mercedes-Benz M104 engine
 M-104 highway (Michigan), a road in the United States
 a Y-chromosome mutation, also called P22